The Weatherford Downtown Historic District is located in Weatherford, Texas, the seat of Parker County.

The district was added to the National Register of Historic Places on November 23, 1990.

See also

National Register of Historic Places listings in Parker County, Texas
Recorded Texas Historic Landmarks in Parker County

References

External links

National Register of Historic Places Registration Form: Weatherford Downtown Historic District

Historic districts on the National Register of Historic Places in Texas
Buildings and structures in Parker County, Texas
National Register of Historic Places in Parker County, Texas